José Pacheco may refer to:

José Francisco Pacheco (born 1951), Portuguese educator
José Emilio Pacheco (1939–2014), Mexican essayist, novelist and short story writer
José Condungua Pacheco (born 1958), minister of the interior of Mozambique
José Fernando Pacheco (ornithologist), Brazilian ornithologist, see Yellow-faced parrot 
José Fernando Pacheco (cyclist), see List of former Movistar riders
José Pacheco (cyclist) (born 1942), Olympic Portuguese cyclist
 (1885–1934), Portuguese architect and artist